Stinstedt is a municipality in the district of Cuxhaven, in Lower Saxony, Germany.

History
Stinstedt belonged to the Prince-Archbishopric of Bremen, established in 1180. The farmers were subject with their small tithe to the Himmelpforten Convent, secularised in 1647. In 1648 the Prince-Archbishopric was transformed into the Duchy of Bremen, which was first ruled in personal union by the Swedish Crown - interrupted by a Danish occupation (1712-1715) - and from 1715 on by the Hanoverian Crown.

After a Prussian and then French occupation from 1806 to 1810, the ephemeric Kingdom of Westphalia annexed the Duchy, before France annexed it with effect of 1 January 1811. In 1813 the Duchy was restored to the Electorate of Hanover, which - after its upgrade to the Kingdom of Hanover in 1814 - incorporated the Duchy in a real union and the Ducal territory, including Stinstedt, became part of the new Stade Region, established in 1823.

References